Anna Eleanor Roosevelt, née Roosevelt; (born October 11, 1884  died November 7, 1962); (in position March 4, 1933  April 12, 1945); She was the wife of Franklin Roosevelt. Because her husand was the longest serving President, Eleanor Roosevelt is the longest serving First Lady.

Books about Eleanor Roosevelt
 Beasley, M. H. (1987). Eleanor Roosevelt and the Media: A Public Quest for Self-Fulfillment. Urbana, IL: University of Illinois Press.
 Bell-Scott, P. (2016). The Firebrand and the First Lady: Portrait of a Friendship: Pauli Murray, Eleanor Roosevelt, and the Struggle for Social Justice. New York: Alfred A. Knopf.
 Berger, J. (1981). A New Deal for the World: Eleanor Roosevelt and American Foreign Policy. New York: Columbia University Press.
 Black, A. M. (1996). Casting Her Own Shadow: Eleanor Roosevelt and the Shaping of Postwar Liberalism. New York: Columbia University Press.
 Cook, B. W. (1993). Eleanor Roosevelt: Volume One: The Early Years, 1884-1933. London: Bloomsbury.
 Cook, B. W. (2000). Eleanor Roosevelt: Volume Two: The Defining Years, 1933-1938. London: Bloomsbury.
 Cook, B. W. (2016). Eleanor Roosevelt: Volume Three: The War Years and After, 1939-1962. London: Bloomsbury.
 Glendon, M. A. (2001). A World Made New: Eleanor Roosevelt and the Universal Declaration of Human Rights. New York: Random House.
 Golay, M. (2016). America 1933: The Great Depression, Lorena Hickok, Eleanor Roosevelt, and the Shaping of the New Deal.  New York: Simon & Schuster.
 Goodwin, D. K. (2013). No Ordinary Time: Franklin and Eleanor Roosevelt: The Home Front in World War II. New York: Simon & Schuster.
 Hareven, T. K. (1975). Eleanor Roosevelt: An American Conscience. New York: Da Capo Press.
 Harris, C. M. (2007). Eleanor Roosevelt. Westport, Conn: Greenwood Press.
 Kearney, R. (1968). Anna Eleanor Roosevelt: The Evolution of a Reformer. Boston: Houghton Mifflin Co.
 Lash, J. P. (1982). Love, Eleanor: Eleanor Roosevelt and her Friends. New York: Doubleday.
 Lash, J. P. (1971). Eleanor and Franklin: The Story of Their Relationship, Based on Eleanor Roosevelt's Private Papers. New York: W. W. Norton.
 Lightman, M., & Hoff, J. (1984). Without Precedent: The Life and Career of Eleanor Roosevelt. Bloomington, IN: Indiana University Press.

 Youngs, J. W. T. (2006). Eleanor Roosevelt: A Personal and Public Life. New York: Pearson/Longman.

Journal articles about Eleanor Roosevelt
 Abramowitz, M. (1984). Eleanor Roosevelt and the National Youth Administration 1935-1943: An Extension of the Presidency. Presidential Studies Quarterly, 14(4), pp. 569–580.
 Atwell, M. (1979). Eleanor Roosevelt and the Cold War Consensus. Diplomatic History, 3(1), pp. 99–113.
 Beasley, M. (1986). Eleanor Roosevelt's Vision of Journalism: A Communications Medium for Women. Presidential Studies Quarterly, 16(1), pp. 66–75.
 Black, A. (1990). Championing a Champion: Eleanor Roosevelt and the Marian Anderson "Freedom Concert". Presidential Studies Quarterly, 20(4), pp. 719–736.
 Black, A. (1999). Struggling with Icons: Memorializing Franklin and Eleanor Roosevelt. The Public Historian, 21(1), pp. 63–72.
 Black, A. (2008). Eleanor Roosevelt and the Universal Declaration of Human Rights. OAH Magazine of History, 22(2), pp. 34–37.
 Blair, D. (2001). No Ordinary Time: Eleanor Roosevelt's Address to the 1940 Democratic National Convention. Rhetoric and Public Affairs, 4(2), pp. 203–222.
 Burke, F. (1984). Eleanor Roosevelt, October 11, 1884-November 7, 1962-She Made a Difference. Public Administration Review, 44(5), pp. 365–372.
 Cook, B. (2000). Woman of the Century: Eleanor Roosevelt's Biographer Assesses the Legacy of a First Lady Who Sought Justice for All. The Women's Review of Books, 17(10/11), pp. 22–23.
 Erikson, J. (1964). Nothing to Fear: Notes on the Life of Eleanor Roosevelt. Daedalus, 93(2), pp. 781–801.
 Fogel, D. (1974). Eleanor Roosevelt Writes From European Tour, 1918. The Georgia Review, 28(4), pp. 703–704.
 Gilbert, S., & Shollenberger, K. (2001). Eleanor Roosevelt and the Declaration of Human Rights: A Simulation Activity. OAH Magazine of History, 15(3), pp. 35–36.
 Graham, H. (1987). The Paradox of Eleanor Roosevelt: Alcoholism's Child. The Virginia Quarterly Review, 63(2), pp. 210–230. 
 Grant, P. (1979). Catholic Congressmen, Cardinal Spellman, Eleanor Roosevelt, and the 1949-1950 Federal Aid to Education Controversy. Records of the American Catholic Historical Society of Philadelphia, 90(1/4), pp. 3–13.
 Hobbins, A. (1998). Eleanor Roosevelt, John Humphrey: And Canadian Opposition to the Universal Declaration of Human Rights: Looking Back on the 50th Annivesary of UNDHR. International Journal, 53(2), pp. 325–342.
 Miller, K. (1999). A Volume Of Friendship: The Correspondence of Isabella Greenway and Eleanor Roosevelt, 1904-1953. The Journal of Arizona History, 40(2), pp. 121–156.
 Patton, T. (2006). "What Of Her?" Eleanor Roosevelt and Camp Tera. New York History, 87(2), 228-247.
 Penkower, M. (1987). Eleanor Roosevelt and the Plight of World Jewry. Jewish Social Studies, 49(2), pp. 125–136.
 Pfeffer, P. (1996). Eleanor Roosevelt and the National and World Woman's Parties. The Historian, 59(1), pp. 39–57.
 Roemer, K. (2005). The Multi-Missionary Eleanor Roosevelt of American Indian Literatures. Studies in American Indian Literatures, 17(2), pp. 101–105.
 Seeber, F. (1990). Eleanor Roosevelt and Women in the New Deal: A Network of Friends. Presidential Studies Quarterly, 20(4), pp. 707–717.
 Urdang, I. (2008). Franklin and Eleanor Roosevelt: Human Rights and the Creation of the United Nations. OAH Magazine of History, 22(2), pp. 28–31.
 Winfield, B. (1988). [ Anna Eleanor Roosevelt's White House Legacy: The Public First Lady]. Presidential Studies Quarterly, 18(2), pp. 331–345.
 Winfield, B. (1990). The Legacy of Eleanor Roosevelt. Presidential Studies Quarterly, 20(4), pp. 699–706.
 The First Eleanor Roosevelt International Caucus of Women Political Leaders. (1988). Signs, 13(2), pp. 372–373.

Primary sources written by Eleanor Roosevelt
 Knepper, C. D. (2004). Dear Mrs. Roosevelt: Letters to Eleanor Roosevelt Through Depression and War. New York: Carroll & Graf.
 Roosevelt, E., & Beasley, M. (1983). The White House Press Conference of Eleanor Roosevelt. New York: Garland.
 Roosevelt, E., & Black, A. M. (2007). The Eleanor Roosevelt Papers, Vol. 1: The Human Rights Years, 19451948. Detroit: Thomson Gale.
 Roosevelt, E., & Black, A. M. (2012). The Eleanor Roosevelt Papers, Vol. 2: The Human Rights Years, 19491952. Detroit: Thomson Gale.
 Black, A. M. (2000). Courage in a Dangerous World: The Political Writings of Eleanor Roosevelt. New York: Columbia University Press.
 Roosevelt, E., & Black, A. M. (2007). The Eleanor Roosevelt Papers. Detroit: Charles Scribner's Sons.
 Roosevelt, E., & Roosevelt, I. N. (2014). The Autobiography of Eleanor Roosevelt. New York: Harper Perennial.

See also
 Bibliography of United States presidential spouses and first ladies

Notes

References

Roosevelt, Eleanor
Eleanor Roosevelt
Political bibliographies